The 2021–22 CCHA men's ice hockey season was the 43rd season of play for the Central Collegiate Hockey Association and part of the 2021–22 NCAA Division I men's ice hockey season. The regular season began on October 2, 2021, and concluded on February 26, 2022. The conference tournament began on March 4 and ended on March 19, 2022.

Revival
On February 18, 2020, 7 schools that had previously announced their departure from the WCHA after the 2020–21 season in order to form a new conference officially announced that their new conference would be a reestablished CCHA. Bowling Green, which had been a founding member of the CCHA in 1971 and remained in the conference until its dissolution in 2013, had retained control of the name in the interim.

A year earlier, St. Thomas was involuntarily removed from the MIAC, which would take effect after the 2020–21 scholastic year. In July 2020 the NCAA gave permission for the university to promote its athletic programs from Division III directly to Division I without the normal waiting period or ineligibilities. Within two weeks time, St. Thomas applied for and was approved as the 8th member of the conference to begin play this season.

After the conclusion of the 2020–21 season, Alabama–Huntsville, another WCHA team, submitted a bid to be accepted as the conference's 9th member. On May 5, 2021, the CCHA rejected Alabama–Huntsville's inclusion.

Coaches
Enrico Blasi, formerly the head coach at Miami, was announced as St. Thomas' first head coach at the Division I level on April 2, 2021. At the start of his tenure with St. Thomas, Blasi was just 2 wins shy of 400 for his career.

Records

Standings

Non-Conference record
Of the sixteen teams that are selected to participate in the NCAA tournament, ten will be via at-large bids. Those 10 teams are determined based upon the PairWise rankings. The rankings take into account all games played but are heavily affected by intra-conference results. The result is that teams from leagues which perform better in non-conference are much more likely to receive at-large bids even if they possess inferior records overall.

The CCHA was a bit of a mixed bag with their nonconference results. As many teams finished with losing records as winning marks and the league had nearly an even finish overall. The biggest drag on the CCHA was the performance against the Big Ten, which put the league in poor standings for the postseason. While the record was improved by their results against ECAC Hockey, that conference was one of the weakest for this season and didn't help as much as it might have in other years.

Regular season record

Statistics

Leading scorers
GP = Games played; G = Goals; A = Assists; Pts = Points; PIM = Penalty minutes

Leading goaltenders
Minimum 1/3 of team's minutes played in conference games.

GP = Games played; Min = Minutes played; W = Wins; L = Losses; T = Ties; GA = Goals against; SO = Shutouts; SV% = Save percentage; GAA = Goals against average

Bracket

Note: * denotes overtime periods

NCAA tournament

Regional semifinal

East

West

Regional final

East

National semifinal

National championship

Ranking

USCHO

USA Today

Pairwise

Note: teams ranked in the top-10 automatically qualify for the NCAA tournament. Teams ranked 11-16 can qualify based upon conference tournament results.

Awards

NCAA

CCHA

NCAA tournament

2022 NHL Entry Draft

† incoming freshman

References

External links

2021–22
CCHA
2021–22